Henry Ambrose Oldfield (1822–1871) was a British painter. He also was a doctor in at the British Residency in Kathmandu, Nepal from 1850 to 1863. He also had great relations with Jung Bahadur Rana, former prime minister of Nepal.

Works

References

External links

 

1822 births
1871 deaths
British expatriates in Nepal
British painters